The Danish Film Academy was founded in 1982 by a number of people with professional connection to the film industry. The Academy aims to promote the film as an independent art form, and its members are primarily people who work with film. The Academy's largest annual event is the Robert Award ceremony.

References

External links 
  

Film organizations in Denmark